Perdomo may refer to:

 Perdomo (surname)
 Perdomo (cigar brand), a brand of cigars produced by Tabacalera Perdomo
 Perdomo (TransMilenio), a railway station in Bogota, Colombia

See also
 Prudhomme (disambiguation)